The Mendip transmitting station is a broadcasting and telecommunications facility on the summit of Pen Hill, part of the Mendip Hills range in Somerset, England, at  above sea level. The mast broadcasts digital television, FM analogue radio and DAB digital radio, and had broadcast analogue colour television from 1967 until 2010. It has become a Mendip landmark, providing a method of identifying the hills from a distance.

Description 
The station is owned and operated by Arqiva (which acquired National Grid Wireless, previously Crown Castle).

They were removed in 2010, the antenna cylinder being replaced with a new antenna assembly, ready for digital switchover later that year.

There are red aircraft warning lamps (six sets of two lights) on the mast and two lights on top. The lights were upgraded in February 2007 to comply with CAA 2000 Air Navigation Order, designed to prevent low flying aircraft from hitting the mast. The mast was repainted during 2007.

The mast can be seen from as far away as Puriton during the day and the red aircraft warning lights make it visible at night from pretty much anywhere on the Somerset Levels and the Vale of Glamorgan near Cardiff.

Television
Mendip was configured as a C/D group transmitter when it entered service with analogue PAL transmissions. In July 2007, Ofcom confirmed that it would remain a C/D group transmitter at digital switchover. The mast broadcasts digital television over a large area of the west of England, including Somerset, Wiltshire, North Somerset, Bath and North-East Somerset, Bristol, South Gloucestershire, southern Gloucestershire, northern Dorset and East Devon.

Cardiff and other parts of southeast Wales were also able to receive the analogue TV transmissions from Mendip, and many households used it in preference to their more local Wenvoe transmitter which carries the Wales variations of BBC One, BBC Two, and ITV. This was originally because the Wenvoe transmitter broadcast S4C (with programmes in Welsh and some prime-time English programmes from Channel 4 scheduled at much later times) rather than Channel 4 itself.  Even after digital switchover when transmitters in Wales also began to broadcast Channel 4 in addition to S4C, some households continued with their preference for the West variations of BBC One, BBC Two, and ITV, and having Channel 4 (not S4C) as number 4 on the electronic programme guide.

Power on analogue transmissions was 500 kW (ERP) for BBC 1, BBC2, HTV West, Channel 4, and 126 kW (ERP) for Channel 5. The latter was transmitted outside of the original C/D grouping of the transmitter but most homes in reasonable signal areas for the C/D group could receive it with their C/D group aerial.  All six digital multiplexes were transmitted at 10 kW until switchover in 2010 when the power on the "BBC A", "BBC B/HD" and "D3&4" multiplexes was boosted to 100 kW. In 2011, SDN was boosted to 50 kW and in 2012 the remaining two Arqiva multiplexes were boosted to 50 kW too.

In June 2019, as part of the 700MHz clearance programme, Mendip became K group (excluding muxes 7 and 8, which are due to be switched off between 2020 and 2022). This means that homes in poor signal areas which still have a C/D group aerial may have difficulty in receiving all multiplexes.

Mendip's population coverage is around 1.5 million, although some homes in the immediate vicinity, such as those in Cheddar, are unable to receive a signal due to being in the shadow of the Mendip Hills and therefore depend on local relays.

South East Wales

Television 
Many households in SE Wales use the Mendip transmitting station for their television post digital switchover. Due to the proximity of these areas to Wenvoe, the signal from Wenvoe is too strong for most TV sets, requiring an attenuator to be fitted to maintain a reliable signal. To eliminate hassle, many households instead choose to opt for Mendip, which is the ideal distance to provide a reliable & high quality signal.

Made in Bristol, a directional beam to the Bristol area from Mendip, is also receivable in SE Wales.

Radio 
The Mendip Transmitting Station also broadcasts the digital radio multiplex for South East Wales, to improve signal in areas such as the coastline of SE Wales, where the signal of the SE Wales multiplex from Wenvoe is weak due to hills and cliffs. Kiss 101 on FM is also broadcast to South Wales from the Mendip transmitting station, on a frequency of 101.00MHz. A strong 40kW directional beam towards SE Wales delivers a strong indoor signal with stereo audio available in SE Wales. The signal from the station for Kiss 101 also penetrates the Welsh Valleys and the Brecon Beacons.

Heart & BBC Radio Somerset, on 102.60MHz and 95.50MHz respectively, also deliver stereo reception to SE Wales, albeit a bit weaker than Kiss 101.

D1 National, SDL National & Somerset digital radio multiplexes can also be heard.

Visibility at night 
The Mendip transmitting station is clearly visible on a cloudy or clear night from SE Wales, such as in Penarth, Vale of Glamorgan.

Radio
Mendip broadcasts FM (analogue VHF) radio for BBC Radio Somerset and the Severn Estuary regional service Kiss 101. Mendip also transmits high power Digital Audio Broadcasting (DAB) signals for the Digital One, Sound Digital and BBC National DAB multiplexes, using a directional antenna for the South East Wales local DAB multiplex to improve coverage in parts of the Vale of Glamorgan and Cardiff that are in the shadow of the Wenvoe Transmitting Station. An additional DAB multiplex, MuxCo Somerset, was awarded a licence in 2008 to broadcast local and national services to Somerset, and began transmission in 2014.

The MuxCo Somerset multiplex is also receivable in South East Wales (Cardiff & The Vale).

Output

Radio

Analogue
Kiss 101 is a strong directional beam towards South Wales and the Brecon Beacons.

Digital
South East Wales digital radio is broadcast as the Mendip site is well placed to provide coverage to the area and the coastline of Wales.

Television

Analogue

1 December 1969 – 11 May 1970

11 May 1970 – 30 May 1970

30 May 1970 – 2 November 1982

2 November 1982 – 30 March 1997

30 March 1997 – 15 November 1998

Analogue and digital

15 November 1998 – 24 March 2010
Digital terrestrial television was first transmitted from the Mendip mast from 15 November 1998 using the frequency gaps between the analogue TV broadcasts. To limit interference to the analogue transmissions, power output on the digital multiplexes was low.

24 March 2010 – 7 April 2010
On 24 March 2010 BBC2 was switched off on UHF 64 and HTV West was switched from UHF 61 for its final weeks of service. Multiplex 1 on UHF 59+ was closed and replaced by BBC A on UHF 61 (which had just been vacated by analogue HTV West). BBC A was transmitted at full power (100 kW) and in 64QAM, 8k carriers mode from the start.

Digital

7 April 2010 – 28 September 2011
Following the completion of analogue TV shutdown on 7 April 2010, Mendip transmitted all of its higher powered multiplexes at 100 kW. From this date until the second-stage switchover of 28 September 2011 the frequency allocation was:

28 September 2011 – 28 March 2012
With the completion of digital switchover at Oxford, all multiplexes could be moved to their final channel allocations with the exception of Arqiva A. SDN increased to half its full power output (50 kW).

28 March 2012 – 26 March 2013
On 28 March 2012 Arqiva A moved to its final channel allocation at UHF 56, after the completion of digital switchover at Salisbury. Arqiva A and B and SDN also increased to full power (100 kW) on this date.

27 March 2013 – 27 February 2018
BBC A moved from UHF 61 to UHF 49 to allow for the clearance of the 800 MHz band for 4G LTE mobile services.

27 February 2018 -  4 April 2019 
Arqiva A has moved from UHF 56 to UHF 33 for the start of the 700MHz clearance programme at Mendip.

4 April 2019 – 5 June 2019 
BBC A has moved from UHF 49 to UHF 32 as part of the 700MHz clearance programme at Mendip.

5 June 2019 - Present 
Digital 3&4 has moved from UHF 54 to UHF 34, and BBC B have moved as well from UHF 58 to UHF 35 as part of the 700MHz clearance programme at Mendip. Many Welsh residents also prefer Mendip's service to the Wenvoe service as it provides a stronger signal to the coastline and areas in the shadow of the Wenvoe mast.

See also
List of masts
List of radio stations in the United Kingdom
List of tallest buildings and structures in Great Britain

References

External links

The Transmission Gallery: photographs, coverage maps and information
Info and pictures of Mendip transmitter including historical power/frequency changes and present co-receivable transmitters
Entry at skyscraperpage.com
Mendip Transmitter at thebigtower.com

Buildings and structures in Mendip District
Radio masts and towers in Europe
Transmitter sites in England
Mendip Hills